is a city located in Niigata Prefecture, Japan. , the city had an estimated population of 58,300 in 22,594 households, and a population density of 50 persons per km².

Geography

Murakami is northernmost and easternmost city of Niigata prefecture, and is located on the Sea of Japan coast, bordered by Yamagata Prefecture to the north and east. In terms of area, it is the largest in the prefecture.

Surrounding municipalities
Niigata Prefecture
Tainai
Sekikawa
Yamagata Prefecture
Tsuruoka
Nishikawa
Oguni

Climate 
Murakami has a Humid climate (Köppen Cfa) characterized by warm, wet summers and cold winters with heavy snowfall.

Demographics
Per Japanese census data, the population of Murakami has declined steadily over the past 70 years.

History

The area of present-day Murakami was part of ancient Echigo Province. Murakami developed as a port and a castle town for the Murakami Domain under the Tokugawa shogunate in the Edo period. Even today, the downtown area shows the influence of its past existence as a residence of samurai and merchants. Following the Meiji restoration, the area was organized as part of Iwafune District, Niigata, and the town of Murakami was established with the establishment of the modern municipalities system on April 1, 1889. Murakami was raised to city status on March 31, 1954. On April 1, 2008, the towns of Arakawa and Sanpoku and the villages of Asahi and Kamihayashi (all from Iwafune District) were merged into Murakami.

Government
Murakami has a mayor-council form of government with a directly elected mayor and a unicameral city legislature of 26 members. Murakami, collectively with the villages of Sekikawa and Awashimaura contributes two members to the Niigata Prefectural Assembly. In terms of national politics, the city is part of Niigata 3rd district of the lower house of the Diet of Japan.

Education
Murakami has 21 public elementary schools and seven public middle schools operated by the city government. There is one public middle school and three public high schools operated by the Niigata Prefectural Board of Education. The prefecture also operates one special education school.

Transportation

Railway
 JR East -  Uetsu Main Line
  -  -  -  -  -  -  -  -  -  - 
 JR East - Yonesaka Line

Highway
  – Kamihayashi-Iwafune IC, Murakami-Senami Onsen IC, Murakami-Yamaberi IC, Asahi-Miomote IC, Asahi-Mahoroba IC

Sister city relations
 - Sabae in Fukui Prefecture, Japan.

Local attractions
Famous products of Murakami are tea (Murakami is the northernmost tea-growing spot in Japan), salmon, and Murakami beef. The city is also a tourist spot because of famous Senami Onsen and as a jumping off point to Awashima Island.

National Historic Sites
Yamamoto Site
Murakami Castle ruins
Hirabayashi Castle ruins

Festivals 
, a traditional regional festival, has been held in the downtown area on July 6 and 7, annually, since 1868.

References

External links 

Official Website 
Murakami City Tourism Association 
Discover Uetsu 

 
Cities in Niigata Prefecture
Populated coastal places in Japan